Cheering Section is a 1977 film.

References

External links

1977 films
1970s sex comedy films
American comedy films
Teen sex comedy films
1977 comedy films
1970s English-language films
1970s American films